Cell division cycle and apoptosis regulator protein 1 is a protein that in humans is encoded by the CCAR1 gene.

References

External links

Further reading